"There Is Always Something There to Remind Me" is the final single released by British indie rock band The Housemartins. An unfavourable account of Paul Heaton's schooldays akin to The Smiths' "The Headmaster Ritual", the non-album single was released in April 1988 as a 7" and a 12" and reached No. 35 in the singles chart.

A video was made for the single featuring the band members dressed as school teachers. It was filmed at the Bishop Douglass School in Finchley, Greater London.

The single cover artwork was designed by Paul Warhurst, the bass player with The Gargoyles, another Hull-based band.  The band included former members of the Housemartins, Hugh Whittaker and Ted Key. Warhurst died in 2003.

References

The Housemartins songs
1988 singles
1988 songs
Go! Discs singles
Songs about school
Songs written by Paul Heaton
Songs written by Stan Cullimore